Siddharth Pico Raghavan Iyer (born 11 February 1957), known as Pico Iyer, is a British-born essayist and novelist known chiefly for his travel writing. He is the author of numerous books on crossing cultures including Video Night in Kathmandu, The Lady and the Monk and The Global Soul. He has been a contributor to Time, Harper's, The New York Review of Books, and The New York Times.

Early life
Iyer was born Siddharth Pico Raghavan Iyer in Oxford, England, the son of Indian parents.  His father was Raghavan N. Iyer, a philosopher and political theorist then enrolled in doctoral studies at the University of Oxford. His mother was the religious scholar and teacher Nandini Nanak Mehta. He is the great-great-grandson of Indian Gujarati writer Mahipatram Nilkanth. Both of his parents grew up in India then went to England for tertiary education. His name is a combination of the Buddha's name, Siddhartha and that of the Italian Renaissance philosopher Pico della Mirandola.

When Iyer was seven, in 1964, his family moved to California, when his father started working with the Center for the Study of Democratic Institutions, a California-based think tank, and started teaching at University of California, Santa Barbara. For over a decade, Iyer moved between schools and college in England and his parents' home in California.

He was a King's Scholar at Eton College, and studied at Magdalen College, Oxford and was awarded a congratulatory double first in English literature in 1978. He then received an A.M. in literature from Harvard University in 1980. He received the [Oxford MA] in 1982. In 2017, along with Plácido Domingo and Mario Vargas Llosa, he was awarded an honorary doctorate (in Humane Letters) by Chapman University.

Career
Iyer taught writing and literature at Harvard before joining Time in 1982 as a writer on world affairs. Since then he has travelled widely, from North Korea to Easter Island, and from Paraguay to Ethiopia, while writing works of non-fiction and two novels, including Video Night in Kathmandu (1988), The Lady and the Monk (1991), The Global Soul (2000) and The Man Within My Head (2012). He is also a frequent speaker at literary festivals and universities around the world. He delivered popular TED talks in 2013, 2014, 2016 and 2019 [see ted.com] and has twice been a Fellow at the World Economic Forum in Davos. He appeared in a commercial for "Incredible India" in 2007.

In 2019, he served as Ferris Professor of Journalism at Princeton University, Guest Director of the Telluride Film Festival. He was also the first writer-in-residence at Raffles Hotel Singapore, where he released his book This Could be Home (2019), which explores Singapore's heritage through its landmarks.

Writing themes 
Iyer's writings build on his growing up in a combination of English, American, and Indian cultures. Travel is a key theme in most of his works. In one of his works, The Global Soul (2000) he takes on the international airport as a central subject, along with associated jet lag, displacement and cultural mingling. As a travel writer, he often writes of living between the cracks and outside fixed categories. Many of his books have been about trying to see from within some society or way of life, but from an outsider's perspective. He has filed stories from Bhutan, Nepal, Ethiopia, Cuba, Argentina, Japan, and North Korea Some of the topics that he explores in his works include revolution in Cuba, Sufism, Buddhist Kyoto, and global disorientation. In his own words from a 1993 article in Harper's,  "I am a multinational soul on a multinational globe on which more and more countries are as polyglot and restless as airports. Taking planes seems as natural to me as picking up the phone or going to school; I fold up my self and carry it around as if it were an overnight bag." His writing alternating between the monastery and the airport, the Indian writer Pradeep Sebastian writes about Iyer, as "Thomas Merton on a frequent flier pass aiming to bring new global energies and possibilities into non-fiction".

He has written numerous pieces on world affairs for Time, including cover stories, and the "Woman of the Year" story on Corazon Aquino in 1986. He has written on literature for The New York Review of Books; on globalism for Harper's; on travel for the Financial Times; and on many other themes for The New York Times, National Geographic, The Times Literary Supplement, contributing up to a hundred articles a year to various publications. He has contributed liner-notes for four Leonard Cohen albums. His books have appeared in 23 languages so far, including Turkish, Russian, and Indonesian. He has also written introductions to more than 70 books, including works by R. K. Narayan, Somerset Maugham, Graham Greene, Michael Ondaatje, Peter Matthiessen, and Isamu Noguchi. He also writes regularly on sport, film, religion and the convergence of mysticism and globalism.

He has appeared seven times in the annual Best Spiritual Writing anthology, and three times in the annual Best American Travel Writing anthology, and has served as guest editor for both. He has also appeared in the Best American Essays anthology.

The Utne Reader named him in 1995 as one of 100 Visionaries worldwide who could change your life, while the New Yorker observed that "As a guide to far-flung places, Pico Iyer can hardly be surpassed."

Personal life
Iyer has been based since 1992 in Nara, Japan, where he lives with his Japanese wife, Hiroko Takeuchi, and her two children from an earlier marriage. His book, The Lady and the Monk (1991), was a memoir and a reflection of his relationship with Takeuchi. His family home in Santa Barbara, California burned down due to a wildfire in 1990. Reflecting on this event, in his words, “For more and more of us, home has really less to do with a piece of soil, than you could say, with a piece of soul.” He splits his time between Japan and California. Asked if he feels rooted and accepted as a foreigner (regarding his current life in Japan) Iyer notes:"Japan is therefore an ideal place because I never will be a true citizen here, and will always be an outsider, however long I live here and however well I speak the language. And the society around me is as comfortable with that as I am… I am not rooted in a place, I think, so much as in certain values and affiliations and friendships that I carry everywhere I go; my home is both invisible and portable. But I would gladly stay in this physical location for the rest of my life, and there is nothing in life that I want that it doesn’t have."

Iyer has known the 14th Dalai Lama since he was in his late teens, when he accompanied his father to Dharamshala, India, in 1974. In discussions about his spirituality, Iyer has mentioned not having a formal meditation practice, but practicing regular solitude, visiting a remote hermitage near Big Sur several times a year.

Bibliography

Books

Essays

Book reviews

Selected introductions
 Graham Greene, The Complete Stories
 Peter Matthiessen, The Snow Leopard
 Somerset Maugham, The Skeptical Romancer (editor/writer of introduction)
 R.K. Narayan, A Tiger for Malgudi, The Man-Eater of Malgudi, and The Vendor of Sweets
 Michael Ondaatje, The English Patient
 Hermann Hesse, Siddhartha (Peter Owen Publishers in London brought this out in August 2012)
 Arto Paasilinna, The Year of the Hare
 Frederic Prokosch, The Asiatics
 Donald Richie, The Inland Sea
 Nicolas Rothwell, Wings of the Kite-Hawk
 Huston Smith, Tales of Wonder
 Lawrence Weschler, A Wanderer in the Perfect City
 Natsume Soseki, The Gate (2012)

Notes

Further consideration

External links
 picoiyerjourneys.com – Official website
 An interview with Pico Iyer in Nara, Japan on Notebook on Cities and Culture
 An interview with Pico Iyer in Los Angeles on Notebook on Cities and Culture
 
 Pico Iyer, "The mysterious man who gave me Japan", BBC Travel, 20 April 2017.

1957 births
Living people
20th-century English novelists
Alumni of Magdalen College, Oxford
English emigrants to Japan
English essayists
English male novelists
English people of Indian descent
English people of Indian Tamil descent
English travel writers
Harvard University alumni
Harvard University faculty
British male essayists
Outlook (Indian magazine) people
People educated at Eton College
People educated at The Dragon School
Writers from Oxford
Time (magazine) people
20th-century essayists
20th-century English male writers
English male non-fiction writers
Nilkanth family